Prognathodes falcifer, the northern scythemarked butterflyfish or northern scythe butterflyfish, is a species of butterflyfish found at rocky reefs in the tropical Eastern Pacific, where found at depths of  off southern California (La Jolla and Santa Catalina Island), southern Baja California, Guadalupe Island, San Benito Island and Revillagigedo Islands. In the past it also included populations off Central and South America, but in 1995 these were described as a separate species, P. carlhubbsi. Compared to that species, P. falcifer has whitish-grey (not clear yellow) belly and flanks, the black line through the eye is paler and less distinct, and the angle of the inverted black "V" on the side is shallower.

References

External links
 

falcifer
Taxa named by Carl Leavitt Hubbs
Taxa named by Andreas Rechnitzer
Fish described in 1958